The Drexel Dragons men's soccer team represents Drexel University. The team is a member of the Colonial Athletic Association of the National Collegiate Athletic Association.

In 1955, the team finished with a record of 11-3-1 and won the Middle Atlantic Conferences (MAC) championship for the first time.  After finishing the regular season tied for first place in the conference's Southeastern division, they won a one-game playoff against Bucknell, and then went on to defeat Rutgers in the conference championship game.

In 1958 with a 12-0-0 record, the team was awarded the National Championship by the Intercollegiate Soccer Football Association of America, then the governing body of men's college soccer. This occurred the year before the NCAA instituted a playoff system and so Drexel's championship is not officially recognized today by the NCAA.

See also 
 1958 Drexel Dragons men's soccer team
 :Category:Drexel Dragons men's soccer players

References

External links
 

 
Drexel Dragons
1947 establishments in Pennsylvania
Association football clubs established in 1947